Catholic Central High School in Burlington, Wisconsin, United States, is a private, Catholic, co-educational high school in the Archdiocese of Milwaukee.
Founded in 1920, it offers both college-prep and general studies for grades 9 through 12.

Accreditation
CCHS is a member of the National Catholic Educational Association and is accredited by AdvancED.

References

History of Catholic Central High School 
2nd Ranked Private High School in Racine County

External links
Official website
Official CCHS Blog Site
CCHS offers Greco-Roman Wrestling 

Roman Catholic Archdiocese of Milwaukee
Schools in Racine County, Wisconsin
Educational institutions established in 1920
Catholic secondary schools in Wisconsin
1920 establishments in Wisconsin